White River National Forest is a National Forest in northwest Colorado. It is named after the White River that passes through its northern section. It is the most visited National Forest in the United States, primarily from users of the twelve ski areas within its boundaries.

The forest contains 2,285,970 acres (3,571.8 sq mi, or 9,250.99 km²). In descending order of land area it is located in parts of Eagle,
Pitkin, Garfield, Summit, Rio Blanco, Mesa, Gunnison, Routt, and Moffat counties.

The White River National Forest provides significant habitat for deer, elk, mountain sheep, mountain goat, bear, mountain lion, bobcat, lynx, moose, raptors, waterfowl, trout and many other species of wildlife.

The forest contains 1,900 mi. (3,058 km) of forest system roads, 2,500 mi (4,023 km) of trails, and the Dillon, Green Mountain, Ruedi, and Homestake reservoirs.

The forest is managed from Forest Service offices in Glenwood Springs. There are local ranger district offices in Aspen, Carbondale, Eagle, Meeker, Minturn, Rifle, and Silverthorne.

The Dillon Ranger district, run out of Silverthorne, was transferred from the Arapahoe National Forest to the White River National Forest in 1998.

Wilderness areas
There are eight officially designated wilderness areas lying within White River National Forest that are part of the National Wilderness Preservation System. Five of them extend into neighboring National Forests (as indicated).
Collegiate Peaks Wilderness (the largest part in San Isabel NF; also partly in Gunnison NF)
Eagles Nest Wilderness
Flat Tops Wilderness (partly in Routt NF) (considered by some accounts the birthplace of the U.S. Wilderness Area system)
Holy Cross Wilderness (partly in San Isabel NF)
Hunter-Fryingpan Wilderness
Maroon Bells–Snowmass Wilderness (partly in Gunnison NF)
Ptarmigan Peak Wilderness
Raggeds Wilderness (mostly in Gunnison NF)

Ski areas
The following ski areas are located inside the forest:

Arapahoe Basin
Aspen Mountain
Aspen Highlands
Beaver Creek
Breckenridge
Buttermilk
Copper Mountain
Ski Cooper (divided between WRNF and San Isabel National Forest)
Keystone
Snowmass
Sunlight
Vail

Fourteeners
There are ten peaks with an elevation higher than 14,000 ft (4,267m), colloquially known as 14ers in the forest: 
Castle Peak 14,279 ft. (4,352 m), Maroon Bells-Snowmass Wilderness, Elk Mountains
Grays Peak 14,278 ft (4,352 m), Front Range (bisected by White River National Forest and Arapahoe National Forest boundary)
Torreys Peak 14,274 ft (4,351 m), Front Range (also divided between WRNF and Arapahoe National Forest)
Quandary Peak, 14,271 ft (4,350 m) Tenmile Range
Capitol Peak 14,137 ft. (4,309 m), Maroon Bells-Snowmass Wilderness, Elk Mountains
Maroon Peak, the higher of the two Maroon Bells summits, 14,163 ft (4,317 m), Maroon Bells-Snowmass Wilderness, Elk Mountains
Snowmass Mountain 14,099 ft (4,297 m), Maroon Bells-Snowmass Wilderness, Elk Mountains
Pyramid Peak 14,025 ft (4,275 m), Maroon Bells-Snowmass Wilderness, Elk Mountains
Mount of the Holy Cross 14,011 ft. (4,271 m), Holy Cross Wilderness, Sawatch Range

The following two peaks are often included in lists of the Colorado fourteeners, but do not pass the 300 ft. topographic prominence metric commonly used by U.S. Mountaineers:   
North Maroon Peak, the lower of the two Maroon Bells Summits 14,019 ft. (4,273 m), Maroon Bells-Snowmass Wilderness, Elk Mountains
Conundrum Peak, a neighboring summit of Castle Peak, 14,040 ft. (4279 m), Maroon Bells-Snowmass Wilderness, Elk Mountains

See also
Harker Park Lake
Hanging Lake
Deer Creek Trail

References

  
"White River has 70 Streams and 110 lakes for fish," June 10, 1937. (Colorado Historic Collection)
Aspen Daily Times. "Recreation in the Forest ." March 1, 1945 (Colorado Historic Collection)

Axelton, John . Big Game Hunters Guide to Colorado. second ed. : Wilderness Adventures Press, 2008. (Google Books)

Forest Plan Focus, White River National Forest, August 1997. S.l.: s.n., 1997. (Google Books)
Graves, Henry S.. Vacation days in Colorado's national forests. Washington: G.P.O., 1919.(Google Books)

N.p., n.d. Web. <www.nps.gov2Fthro2Fhistoryculture2Ftheodore-roosevelt-quotes.htm>.

External links

White River National Forest (United States Forest Service)

 
Protected areas of Eagle County, Colorado
Protected areas of Garfield County, Colorado
National Forests of Colorado
National Forests of the Rocky Mountains
Protected areas of Pitkin County, Colorado
Protected areas on the Colorado River
Protected areas of Rio Blanco County, Colorado
Protected areas of Mesa County, Colorado
Protected areas established in 1902
1902 establishments in Colorado